Ann Davison Sattler is an American attorney and politician serving as the Seattle City Attorney. She was elected in November 2021.

Career
Davison had practiced law for 15 years prior to being elected Seattle city attorney.  In 2019, Davison unsuccessfully challenged Debora Juarez, an incumbent member of the Seattle City Council. She had run on a platform of removing homeless encampments from public areas and constructing emergency shelters to house them.

A former Democrat, in 2020, Davison left the Democratic Party to became a Republican. She made an unsuccessful bid for lieutenant governor of Washington, finishing third in the nonpartisan primary with 12 percent of the vote, behind Democrats Denny Heck and Marko Liias. She promoted her status as an ex-Democrat, associating with the WalkAway campaign of Democrats-turned-Republicans. In making the case for her party switch, Davison posted a video to YouTube in June 2020 outlining her belief that the Democratic Party had become “far left” and stating she had come to no longer identify with it. She later confirmed she voted for Democrat Joe Biden for president that same year.

In 2021, Davison ran for Seattle city attorney. She played down her party affiliation in the overwhelmingly Democratic city, focusing instead on the views of her opponent, Democrat Nicole Thomas-Kennedy, who had advocated for the abolition of the police. Davison was declared the winner by media outlets on November 5, 2021, having defeated Thomas-Kennedy. While Thomas-Kennedy received the support of many labor unions and Democratic politicians during her campaign, her rhetoric repelled many Democratic-aligned voters who ultimately supported Davison in protest of the positions taken by Thomas-Kennedy. Three former governors of Washington endorsed Davison in her campaign, Democrats Christine Gregoire and Gary Locke, and Republican Dan Evans.

Davison earned a BA in Sociology from Baylor University in 1990, and her law degree from Willamette University College of Law in 2004.

References

Living people
Washington (state) lawyers
Lawyers from Seattle
Washington (state) city attorneys
Washington (state) Republicans
Year of birth missing (living people)